Somali Faces is a non-profit organization that shares everyday stories of ordinary Somali people from around the world. It was founded by Mohammed Ibrahim Shire, a storyteller, an author and an academician.

Blog

Somali diaspora
Mohammed & Donia started the Somali Faces platform in January 2016. They have travelled across Europe and Americas by initially focusing on Somalis living in the Diaspora. This allowed them to narrate the Diaspora experience in the face of perpetual negativity of Somalis in the media.

Somalis in Somalia
Following this, they have started touring the Horn of Africa visiting many remote villages and towns in Somalia and Somaliland to capture the human stories.

Humanitarianism
In January 2017, following the gang rape of two Somali girls in Galdogob, Somalia, and the subsequent release of the video footage, Somali Faces raised emergency funds online to resettle the two families.

Awards
2018: International Somali Award, Innovative category, 2018 International Somali Awards for Somali Faces.

References 

General references

Somali culture
Photoblogs
Facebook groups
Internet properties established in 2016